= Marius Meisfjord Jøsevold =

Norwegian politician (born 1975)

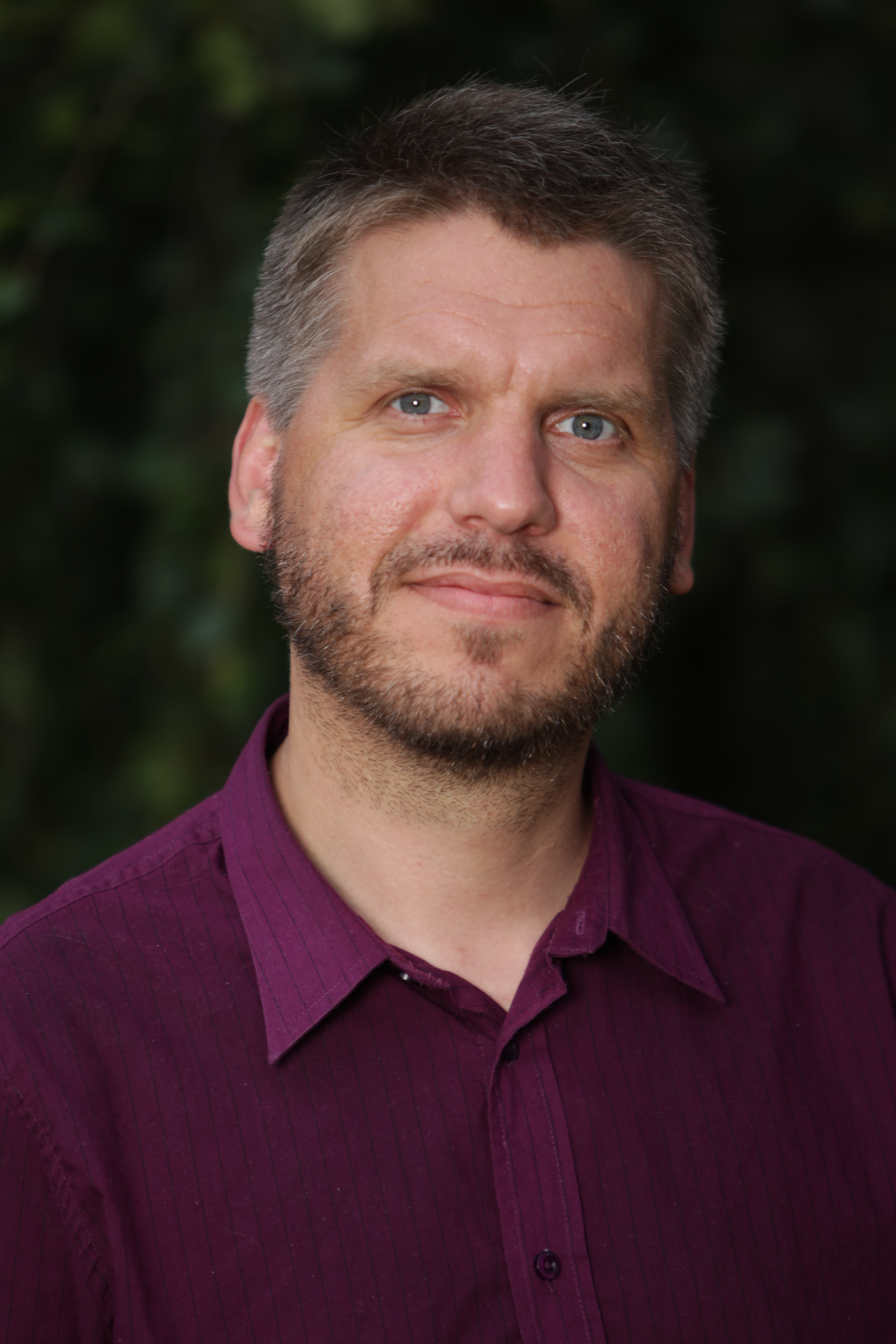
Portrait of Marius Meisfjord Jøsevold

Marius Meisfjord Jøsevold (born 11 January 1975) is a Norwegian politician for the Socialist Left Party.

He served as a deputy representative to the Parliament of Norway from Nordland during the terms 2009–2013 and 2017–2021.
